Brooten is a city in Stearns and Pope counties in the U.S. state of Minnesota, United States. The population was 743 as of the 2010 census. Almost the entire city is within Stearns County, with a small portion in Pope County.

The Stearns County portion of Brooten is part of the St. Cloud Metropolitan Statistical Area.

History
Brooten was laid out in 1886, when the Soo Railroad was extended to that point. The city was named after the LiaBraaten family of settlers. A post office has been in operation at Brooten since 1886.

Geography

Demographics

2010 census
As of the census of 2010, there were 743 people, 294 households, and 167 families living in the city. The racial makeup of the city was 98.7% White, 0.3% African American, 0.1% Native American, 0.1% Asian, 0.3% from other races, and 0.5% from two or more races. Hispanic or Latino of any race were 2.6% of the population.

There were 294 households, of which 27.6% had children under the age of 18 living with them, 41.8% were married couples living together, 10.5% had a female householder with no husband present, 4.4% had a male householder with no wife present, and 43.2% were non-families. 38.4% of all households were made up of individuals, and 22.1% had someone living alone who was 65 years of age or older. The average household size was 2.28 and the average family size was 3.00.

The median age in the city was 43.9 years. 22.9% of residents were under the age of 18; 6.8% were between the ages of 18 and 24; 22% were from 25 to 44; 20.5% were from 45 to 64; and 27.7% were 65 years of age or older. The gender makeup of the city was 49.3% male and 50.7% female.

2000 census
As of the census of 2000, there were 649 people, 278 households, and 167 families living in the city. The racial makeup of the city was 99.38% White, 0.15% Native American, 0.15% Pacific Islander, 0.15% from other races, and 0.15% from two or more races. Hispanic or Latino of any race were 2.93% of the population.

There were 278 households, out of which 30.6% had children under the age of 18 living with them, 51.8% were married couples living together, 5.4% had a female householder with no husband present, and 39.6% were non-families. 34.5% of all households were made up of individuals, and 20.5% had someone living alone who was 65 years of age or older.  The average household size was 2.33 and the average family size was 3.03.

In the city, the population was spread out, with 27.7% under the age of 18, 5.2% from 18 to 24, 24.3% from 25 to 44, 21.0% from 45 to 64, and 21.7% who were 65 years of age or older.  The median age was 39 years. For every 100 females, there were 89.2 males.  For every 100 females age 18 and over, there were 87.6 males.

The median income for a household in the city was $35,625, and the median income for a family was $43,083. Males had a median income of $26,250 versus $20,156 for females. The per capita income for the city was $17,048.  About 8.1% of families and 12.9% of the population were below the poverty line, including 16.0% of those under age 18 and 19.5% of those age 65 or over.

Arts and culture

Annual cultural events
Brooten hosts a community celebration called Bonanza Valley Days on the second weekend of July. It begins with a dance on Friday and ends with an Ice Cream Social on Sunday.  Events include a bike rally, fireworks, pageant, kiddie parade, grand parade, and more.

Education
Belgrade–Brooten–Elrosa Elementary School is located in Brooten.  The school is part of the Belgrade-Brooten-Elrosa School District—ISD #2364.

Infrastructure

Transportation
Minnesota State Highway 55 serves as a main route in the community.

The Brooten Municipal Airport is approximately one mile southeast of the city and has a paved, 3500-foot runway.

References

External links
 
City Website
ePodunk

Cities in Minnesota
Cities in Stearns County, Minnesota
Cities in Pope County, Minnesota
St. Cloud, Minnesota metropolitan area